Lantern tree is a common name for several plants and may refer to:

Crinodendron hookerianum, or Chilean lantern tree
Dichrostachys cinerea, or Chinese lantern tree, native to Africa and widely introduced
Hernandia nymphaeifolia, or Chinese lantern tree, native to coastal areas throughout the tropics
Nymania capensis, or Chinese lantern tree, native to southern Africa